Nordic Strength or Nordisk Styrke is a Nordic far right paramilitary group, founded in August 2019 by members of the Nordic Resistance Movement. Members of Nordic Strength have been convicted of over 100 violent crime and weapons offences. In April 2021, Nordic Strength opened a gym for training in combat skills and tactics.

References

Paramilitary organizations
Far-right movements in Europe
Nordic countries
2019 establishments in Europe